The South African cricket team toured England in the 1960 season to play a five-match Test series against England. England won the series 3-0 with 2 matches drawn.

The team

 Jackie McGlew (captain)
 Neil Adcock
 Peter Carlstein
 Chris Duckworth
 Jonathan Fellows-Smith
 Trevor Goddard
 Geoff Griffin
 Atholl McKinnon
 Roy McLean
 Sid O'Linn
 Tony Pithey
 Jim Pothecary
 Hugh Tayfield
 John Waite 
 Colin Wesley

Dudley Nourse was the manager.

The tour
"From nearly every point of view the ninth South African tour of England proved disappointing," Wisden's editor, Norman Preston, began his report. First, it was a wet summer, and many matches were disrupted by rain. Second, the young fast bowler Geoff Griffin was no-balled for throwing on several occasions, effectively ending his career. Third, anti-apartheid demonstrations were held outside most venues. Fourth, none of the young players showed signs of developing into good Test players. Fifth, South Africa lost the first three Tests and drew the other two. Sixth, the tour showed a financial loss. Seventh, apart from Roy McLean the South Africans "found themselves short of enterprising batsmen".

Test series summary

First Test

Second Test

Third Test

Fourth Test

Fifth Test

References

Annual reviews
 Playfair Cricket Annual 1961
 Wisden Cricketers' Almanack 1961

Further reading
 John Arlott, Cricket on Trial, Heinemann, 1960
 Charles Fortune, Cricket Overthrown, Howard Timmins, 1960
 John Waite & R. S. Whitington, Perchance to Bowl, Nicholas Kaye, 1961
 Various writers, A Century of South Africa in Test & International Cricket 1889-1989, Ball, 1989

External links
 South Africa in England 1960 at CricketArchive
 South Africa to England 1960 at Test Cricket Tours
 South Africans in England, 1960 - Wisden (1961)

1960 in English cricket
1960 in South African cricket
International cricket competitions from 1945–46 to 1960
1960
June 1960 sports events in the United Kingdom
July 1960 sports events in the United Kingdom
August 1960 sports events in the United Kingdom